The Dolores Kohl education foundation was established with the goal of enhancing children’s learning through the support of exemplary teaching. The Dolores Kohl Education Foundation was launched in 1972 as a private, not-for-profit international operating foundation that creates and directs its own programs. A catalyst for excellence in education, the Foundation has developed numerous education and arts programs in the United States and abroad. The Foundation currently directs early childhood teaching awards and an urban early literacy program that includes a traveling children’s museum-on-wheels. The Foundation is in Highland Park, Illinois.

Foundation Programs	
Kohl McCormick StoryBus, 2000–present 
Kohl McCormick Early Childhood Teaching Awards, 1996 – present
Kohl McCormick Academy of Outstanding Educators, 1985–present 
Kohl International Teaching Awards, 1985 - 1994 
Kohl Children's Museum, Wilmette, Illinois, 1985 – 2000 
Kohl Teacher Centers, Illinois and Israel, 1972 -1988

Founder
Dolores Kohl, President and CEO, is the founder of the Dolores Kohl Education Foundation. Kohl’s work focuses on early childhood education, with a current emphasis on literacy efforts for low-income urban families. Published works include Gladly We Teach; Ideas in Social Studies; Ideas in Math; Teacher Centers in the '80s; Language Arts; and Teaching Soviet Children.

External links
Dolores Kohl Education Foundation
Kohl McCormick StoryBus
Kohl McCormick Early Childhood Teaching Awards
Kohl Children's Museum

Educational foundations in the United States
Charities based in Illinois